Craig T. Miller (born October 4, 1977) is a former American football cornerback who played one season with the Jacksonville Jaguars of the NFL. He also played for the Barcelona Dragons in 2001. He played college football at Utah State.

References

Jacksonville Jaguars players
1977 births
Players of American football from Bakersfield, California
Utah State Aggies football players
American football cornerbacks
Living people